The Jane Goodall Institute (Hong Kong), founded in 2002, was established as a local registered charity involved in the promotion of the well-being of the community, animals and environment. With its headquarters in the US, the Jane Goodall Institute is a worldwide non-profit organization with 17 overseas offices.

Objectives and missions

The objectives of the Institute are:

 To promote the conservation of primate habitat.
 To increase awareness, support and training on issues related to human relationships with one another, the environment, as well as other animals.
 To expand non-invasive research programmes on chimpanzees and other primates.
 To promote activities to ensure the well-being of chimpanzees, other primates and animals in general.

The Jane Goodall Institute's official statement of their mission: 
"The Jane Goodall Institute advances the power of individuals to take informed and compassionate action to improve the environment of all living things."

Funding 
The Jane Goodall Institute (Hong Kong) depends on supports in the forms of donations, sponsorship, collaboration partnership.

However, the Institute declines to reveal specifically the individuals or organisations which have contributed to the funding.

Comparison with other environmental organisations
In terms of mission, the Jane Goodall Institute has perhaps the most similar to that of WWF Hong Kong, as both organisations feature balanced focus on the environment and animals. While the Jane Goodall Institute is more inclined to the conservation of primates and other animals, Green Power focuses primarily on butterfly research and conservation, especially in the upcoming years. The objectives of Greenpeace are more general by comparison, as they aim to stop the climate change and to eliminate toxic chemicals. They put less emphasis on animal conservation, setting themselves apart from the Jane Goodall Institute. The Animals Asia Foundation has the most straightforward objective, as it aims to conserve animals exclusively. On the other hand, Green Power and the Jane Goodall Institute stress more on environmental education. Both organisations have set up the educational units Green School and Roots and Shoots, respectively. Furthermore, the Jane Goodall Institute, Greenpeace and WWF are global organisations, whereas Green Power and Animals Asia Foundation are Hong Kong-based.

Roots & Shoots 
Roots & Shoots is the global conservation and education programme founded by Dr. Jane Goodall, which serves as the core programme of Jane Goodall Institute.

It is the agenda of the programme to implement positive changes through education. Its objectives are to interact with the environment, to demonstrate care and compassion for animals and all lifeforms, to establish a better understanding among different cultures, ethnic groups, religions, socio-economic classes and nations. It also aims to assist young people to develop as confident and positive individuals.

Origin of the name

Literally, roots and shoots mean:
 root - the part of the plant which grows down into the earth to obtain water and food and which holds the plant firmly in the ground.
 shoot- the first part of a plant to appear above the earth from a seed, or any new growth on an already existing plant.

A deeper connotation of Roots & Shoots is:

roots lead to a strong and firm foundation
shoots seem infinitesimal in their unending pursuit of sunlight.

By bonding, they can break through the brick walls, a metaphorical representation of the problems human beings suffer from globally.

The history of Roots & Shoots
Roots & Shoots began with 16 students who were interested in animals and environment conservation. However, they realised they were not able to obtain sufficient support and resources they would need from school. They, therefore, went to meet Dr. Goodall on her front porch in Dar es Salaam, Tanzania in 1991. After a deep conversation, they returned to school and began to look for like-minded students to realise their goals. The Roots & Shoots programme was then born. Now there are more than 4500 groups around the world in over 70 countries, including more than 7 countries in Asia, such as Hong Kong, China, Japan, Taiwan, Singapore, Korea and Malaysia.

Projects by Roots & Shoots (Hong Kong)

Monkey Conservation Ambassador Programme
A programme open to tertiary students in order to raise the awareness of Hong Kong's wild macaques in Country Parks, as well as to cut down complaints, attacks and illegal feeding.

 Pollution in Hong Kong

The Roots and Shoots group aims to raise public awareness of problems from air, water and land pollutions in Hong Kong. The group also aims to help solve these problems by raising funds.

 Human impact on the environment

The Guardians of the Earth aims to investigate how humans are affecting their natural environment. They started their projects by observing man-made objects and human activities in relation to the environment.

 Care for animals

The Roots and Shoots group from the Tack Ching Primary School held a campaign of animal care. Activities include visiting the Society for the Prevention of Cruelty to Animals (SPCA) Wanchai Centre and fund-raising for the SPCA. The group also collected used towels and toys for abandoned dogs at SPCA.

 Care for Hong Kong's environment

Roots and Shoots members from various schools and communities joined hands at the Beach Cleaning Day at Sha Chau & Lung Kwu Chau Marine Park. They also organized a Chinese white dolphin boat trip.

 Care for Hong Kong's community and environment

Roots and Shoots members joined some scout members in an activity in which they learned the skills of planting. The 'Shoots of Hope' were sent to Hong Kong School For The Deaf and Methodist Yang Center.

 Roots & Shoots Day 2002
(with photos and a brief description of the activity in Chinese)

Membership in Hong Kong

Among the more than 4500 groups around the world in over 70 countries, members of Roots and Shoots in Hong Kong include students from local primary and secondary schools, such as the Hong Kong International School, Hong Kong's Victoria Shanghai Academy and Tack Ching Primary School.

Voices from members worldwide

“I attribute all my successes to Roots & Shoots. The program lifted me from nowhere and has put me to where I am right now. It gave me confidence and a great sense of pride. Sometimes I can't even imagine... I think it's time I give back, to the fullest, all what I received from R&S.”—Yared Fubusa, Graduate Student, University of Virginia

“The College Summit is certainly one of the most amazing experiences I've ever had and will ever have.... Miracles happen when a bunch of good guys get together like we did.”—ZeeZee, Member, Shanghai Roots & Shoots

“It is thrilling for our group to know that by belonging to Roots & Shoots, we are connected to the rest of the world. Our actions have a direct impact in solving problems…Middle-class, suburban American families are very busy these days with work and raising kids. Parents want positive activities for their kids and being able to perform service projects together as a family is very special.”—Wanda Leopold, Leader of Family Group, Mt. Prospect, Illinois

Books related to Roots & Shoots 
 Chinese version - 根與芽－改變世界的起點
 根與芽(兒童繪本)

Who is Jane Goodall? 

Jane Goodall, PhD, DBE, the founder of the Jane Goodall Institute, was born in London, England on April 3, 1934. As a child she was given a lifelike chimpanzee toy named Jubilee by her father, although friends believed it would scare her. Today, the toy still sits on her dresser in London. After the divorce of her parents when Goodall was only 12, she moved with her mother to Bournemouth.

It was while in Bournemouth that Goodall first met up with distinguished wildlife authority Sir David Attenborough, who taught her the importance of the higher order primates, and impressed upon her the need to defend the fragile biosphere.

Goodall was interested in animals from her youth; this prompted noted anthropologist Louis Leakey to hire her as his assistant/secretary. He invited her to accompany him and his wife, Mary Leakey, to dig at Olduvai Gorge. Eventually he asked Jane to study the chimpanzees of Gombe Stream National Park (then known as Gombe Stream Chimpanzee Reserve). She arrived at Gombe in July, 1960. Leakey arranged for Goodall to return to the UK where she earned a doctorate in ethology from the University of Cambridge in 1964. Along with Dian Fossey, famous for living with gorillas, and Biruté Galdikas, who advanced studies in orangutans, Goodall was one of three women Louis Leakey called The Trimates, recently dubbed by some as "Leakey's Angels".

Jane Goodall and her chimpanzees 

Goodall is best known for her study of chimpanzee social and family life. In 1977, Goodall established the Jane Goodall Institute (JGI), which supports the Gombe research and is a global leader in the effort to protect chimpanzees and their habitats. With 19 offices around the world, the institute is widely recognized for innovative, community-centered conservation and development programs in Africa and a global youth program, Roots & Shoots, which currently has over 8,000 groups in 96 countries. Today, Dr Goodall devotes virtually all of her time to advocating on behalf of chimpanzees and the environment, traveling nearly 300 days a year.

Goodall was instrumental in the study of social learning, primate cognition, thinking and culture in wild chimpanzees, their differentiation from the bonobo, and the inclusion of both species along with the gorilla as hominids.

One of Goodall's major contributions to the field of primatology was the discovery of tool making in chimpanzees. She discovered that some chimpanzees alter pieces of grass or twigs and then poke them into termite mounds. The termites would grab onto the blade of grass or twig with their mandibles and the chimpanzees would then just pull the grass out and eat the termites. Though many animals had been clearly observed using "tools", previously, only humans were thought to make tools, and tool-making was considered the defining difference between humans and other animals. This discovery convinced several scientists to reconsider their definition of being human. Another characteristic of the chimpanzee that Goodall discovered was their cooperative hunting of red colobus monkeys.

Goodall also set herself apart from the traditional conventions of the time in her study of primates by naming the animals she studied, instead of assigning each a number. This numbering was a nearly universal practice at the time, and thought to be important in the removal of one's self from the potential for emotional attachment to the subject being studied. Among those that Goodall named during her first years in Gombe were:

 David Greybeard, a grey-chinned male who first warmed up to Goodall.
 Goliath, a friend of David Greybeard, named for his bold nature.
 Mr. McGregor, a belligerent older male.
 Flo, a motherly female with a bulbous nose and ragged ears, and her children, Figan, Faben, Fifi, and Flint
 Olly, a shy female, and her son, Evered, and her elf-like daughter, Gilka
 Passion, an asocial, harsh, fierce, cannibalistic female and her daughter, Pom, and her son, Prof

External links 
 The Jane Goodall Institute Hong Kong
 The Jane Goodall Institute(Taiwan)
 The Jane Goodall Institute Homepage
 The Roots and Shoots Homepage
 Monkey Conservation Ambassador Programme

Primatology
Nature conservation organisations based in Asia
Jane Goodall
Organizations established in 2002
2002 establishments in Hong Kong